Edward Valentine Bonnemère, known professionally as Eddie Bonnemère (February 15, 1921 – March 19, 1996), was an African-American jazz pianist as well as a Catholic church musician and composer. His "Missa Hodierna" became in 1965 the first Jazz Mass ever used in a Catholic church in the United States.

Career 
Bonnemère already played as a church pianist in Harlem during his school days. After military service in World War II He played with Claude Hopkins, and then received his master's degree from New York University.

In 1953 he led a combo with Ray Barretto in the Savoy Ballroom. In 1955, he had a Mambo band. He joined in 1956 the Detroit club Baker's Keyboard Lounge and released on the label Royal Roost the 10-inch album Ti-Pi-Tin / Five O'Clock Whistle. He followed in 1959 when his trio recorded the LP Piano Bon-Bons and 1960's The Sound of Memory. In 1964 (with the participation of Kenny Burrell) his album Jazz Orient-ed was released on Prestige Records.

In the mid-1960s, Bonnemère was one of the protagonists of an Africanization of the Catholic Mass spearheaded by Fr Clarence Rivers, as part of the Black Catholic Movement. In 1965 he wrote—influenced by Mary Lou Williams—the Missa Hodierna for jazz ensemble and choir, which was first presented in 1966 during a service in Harlem's St. Charles Borromeo Church, making history as one of the first US Jazz Masses ever. This Mass was also performed in the Town Hall together with Howard McGhee's instrumental composition Bless You.

In later years he worked as a church musician and composed the Missa Laetare and other liturgical works. He was also musical director of the Church of St. Thomas the Apostle in Manhattan, whose choir recorded his Mass for Every Season in 1969.

He died in 1996.

Discography 

 Missa Laetare (Mass of Joy) (Fortress, 1969)
 Mass for Every Season (Community of St. Thomas)
 O Happy the People (Fortress)

References 

African-American jazz pianists
Liturgists
African-American Catholics
Musicians from New York City
Jazz musicians from New York (state)
1921 births
1996 deaths
20th-century African-American people
New York University alumni